Angel Gerardo Suero (born April 20, 1989) is a Dominican basketball player. He entered the 2012 NBA Draft, but was not selected. Suero is also a member of the Dominican Republic national basketball team.

Early life
Suero was born on April 20, 1989, to Gerardo Suero and Zoralla Castillo. His father was a 1980 Olympic Games quarterfinalist in both the 100- and 200-meter dashes. In February 2007, Suero left his hometown of Villa Juana to live in the United States.

High school
Suero attended high school at Our Savior New American School. He averaged 33.1 points and 9.7 rebounds as a senior.

College
Suero attended Wabash Valley College, before transferring to Career Technical Institutes in New York City, and eventually the University of Albany.

Suero averaged 21.5 points per game in his first year at the University of Albany, along with 5.8 rebounds per game.

He claimed honors in the America East Conference as being America East Player of the Week 4 times.

Club career
In the final of the Torneo Superior de Baloncesto, he scored 17 points and 11 rebounds. He was elected the Most Valuable Player of the final series by leading the 3-0 sweep of his team, the Mauricio Báez club, over San Lázaro, with a total of 70 points and an average of 23.3 per game.

References

1989 births
Living people
Albany Great Danes men's basketball players
Basketball players at the 2015 Pan American Games
Basketball players from New York (state)
CB Breogán players
Dominican Republic expatriate basketball people in Spain
Dominican Republic expatriate basketball people in the United States
Dominican Republic men's basketball players
Guaros de Lara (basketball) players
Junior college men's basketball players in the United States
Pan American Games competitors for the Dominican Republic
People from Centereach, New York
Shooting guards
Sportspeople from Suffolk County, New York